Em Prasad Sharma (born 1 April 1975) is an Indian politician. He is a member of the Sikkim Krantikari Morcha party (SKM). He is a member of the Sikkim Legislative Assembly (MLA).

In 2009 EM Prasad Sharma contested form Indian National Congress Namcheybong under the presidentship of Nar Bahadur Bhandari, the ex- Chief Minister of Sikkim.

He is also the Honorable Advisor to the Excise Department for the Government of Sikkim.

References 

1975 births
Sikkim Krantikari Morcha politicians
Sikkim MLAs 2019–2024
Living people
Place of birth missing (living people)